The meridian 67° east of Greenwich is a line of longitude that extends from the North Pole across the Arctic Ocean, Asia, the Indian Ocean, the Southern Ocean, and Antarctica to the South Pole.

The 67th meridian east forms a great circle with the 113th meridian west.

From Pole to Pole
Starting at the North Pole and heading south to the South Pole, the 67th meridian east passes through:

{| class="wikitable plainrowheaders"
! scope="col" width="115" | Co-ordinates
! scope="col" | Country, territory or sea
! scope="col" | Notes
|-
| style="background:#b0e0e6;" | 
! scope="row" style="background:#b0e0e6;" | Arctic Ocean
| style="background:#b0e0e6;" |
|-
| style="background:#b0e0e6;" | 
! scope="row" style="background:#b0e0e6;" | Barents Sea
| style="background:#b0e0e6;" |
|-
| 
! scope="row" | 
| Severny Island, Novaya Zemlya, Arkhangelsk Oblast
|-
| style="background:#b0e0e6;" | 
! scope="row" style="background:#b0e0e6;" | Kara Sea
| style="background:#b0e0e6;" |
|-
| 
! scope="row" | 
| Yamal Peninsula, Yamalo-Nenets Autonomous Okrug
|-
| style="background:#b0e0e6;" | 
! scope="row" style="background:#b0e0e6;" | Kara Sea
| style="background:#b0e0e6;" |
|-
| 
! scope="row" | 
| Yamal Peninsula, Yamalo-Nenets Autonomous Okrug
|-
| style="background:#b0e0e6;" | 
! scope="row" style="background:#b0e0e6;" | Kara Sea
| style="background:#b0e0e6;" | Baydaratskaya Bay
|-
| 
! scope="row" | 
| Yamalo-Nenetsia, Khantia-Mansia, Tyumen Oblast, Kurgan Oblast
|-
| 
! scope="row" | 
| North Kazakhstan Region, Akmola Region, Karaganda Region, Turkistan Region
|-
| 
! scope="row" | 
| Jizzax Region, Samarkand Region (passing through Samarkand), Qashqadaryo Region, Surxondaryo Region
|-
| 
! scope="row" | 
| Balkh Province, Samangan Province, Sar-e Pol Province, Bamyan Province, Daykundi Province, Ghazni Province, Uruzgan Province, Zabul Province, Kandahar Province
|-valign="top"
| 
! scope="row" | 
| Balochistan Sindh - passing through Karachi
|-
| style="background:#b0e0e6;" | 
! scope="row" style="background:#b0e0e6;" | Indian Ocean
| style="background:#b0e0e6;" |
|-
| style="background:#b0e0e6;" | 
! scope="row" style="background:#b0e0e6;" | Southern Ocean
| style="background:#b0e0e6;" |
|-
| 
! scope="row" | Antarctica
| Australian Antarctic Territory, claimed by 
|-
|}

See also
66th meridian east
68th meridian east

e067 meridian east